James Mathews may refer to:

 James Mathews (American politician) (1805–1887), member of the US House of Representatives from Ohio
 James Mathews (Australian politician) (1865–1934), Australian politician
 James Mathews (rugby league) (1968–1992), Australian rugby player
 James M. Mathews, Chancellor of New York University (NYU)
 James McFarlane Mathews (1785–1870), American clergyman in New York City

See also
 James Mathew (born 1961), Indian politician
 James Matthews (disambiguation)